Daniel Kálmán Biss (born August 27, 1977) is an American mathematician and politician serving as mayor of Evanston, Illinois. He previously served as a member of both the Illinois House of Representatives and Illinois Senate.

Prior to pursuing a political career, Biss was an Assistant Professor of Mathematics at the University of Chicago from 2002 to 2008.

A member of the Democratic Party, Biss began his political career by running unsuccessfully as his party's nominee for the 17th district seat in the Illinois House of Representatives in 2008. Biss was successful in 2010 at his second attempt at running for the Illinois House of Representatives, representing its 17th district from 2011 to 2013. In 2012, Biss was elected to the  Illinois Senate, and represented its 9th district from 2013 through 2019. Biss unsuccessfully ran as a candidate in the Democratic primary for Governor of Illinois in the 2018 election. In 2021, he won the election for mayor of Evanston in the city's consolidated primary.

Early life and education 
Biss was born into a Jewish Israeli family of musicians. His brother is the noted pianist Jonathan Biss, his parents are the violinists Paul Biss and Miriam Fried, and his grandmother was the Russian-born cellist Raya Garbousova.

Biss attended Bloomington North High School in Bloomington, Indiana, and he was a finalist in the Westinghouse Science Talent Search in 1995. He
received an undergraduate degree from Harvard University, graduating summa cum laude in 1998, and an MA and Ph.D. at MIT in 2002, both in mathematics. He won the 1999 Morgan Prize for outstanding research as an undergraduate, and was a Clay Research Fellow from 2002 to 2007. His doctoral advisor was Michael J. Hopkins. He was a visiting scholar at the Institute for Advanced Study in the fall of 2003.

Academic career 
Prior to full-time pursuit of a political career, Biss was an Assistant Professor of Mathematics at the University of Chicago from 2002 to 2008.

At least four of the mathematics papers that Biss published in academic journals were later discovered to contain major errors. Mathematician Nikolai Mnëv published a report in 2007 that there was a "serious flaw" in two of Biss's works published in Annals of Mathematics and Advances in Mathematics in 2003, saying "unfortunately this simple mistake destroys the main theorems of both papers". In 2008 and 2009, Biss acknowledged the flaw and published erratum reports for the two papers, thanking Mnëv for drawing his attention to the error. He and a co-author, Benson Farb, also acknowledged in 2009 that there was a "fatal error" in a paper they had published in Inventiones Mathematicae in 2006, thanking mathematicians Masatoshi Sato and Tom Church for helping to explain the problem. Another of his papers published in Topology and its Applications was formally retracted by the publisher in 2017, fifteen years after its 2002 publication, with the journal saying "This article has been retracted at the request of the Editors-in-Chief after receiving a complaint about anomalies in this paper. The editors solicited further independent reviews which indicated that the definitions in the paper are ambiguous and most results are false. The author was contacted and does not dispute these findings." The journal said they had identified twelve specific errors in the paper, but clarified that they had concluded that the paper's findings were merely inaccurate, not fraudulent. When contacted by the journal, Biss had responded saying "Thank you for writing. I am no longer in mathematics and so don't feel equipped to fully evaluate these claims. I certainly do not dispute them. If you would like to publish a retraction to that effect, that would seem to me to be an appropriate approach."

When the 2017 retraction and the previously identified errors were reported by the Chicago Sun-Times in September 2017, his campaign blamed operatives for the perceived front-runner for the Democratic Party candidate for governor of Illinois, J. B. Pritzker, for raising it as a political issue. They said "Whether it was training at MIT or the University of Chicago, Daniel has had dozens of academic papers reviewed by his peers and published. In a few cases, further research has found that the case posited in the original article didn't stand up, and he revised his findings." They referred to the raising of the issue as "silly opposition research".

Illinois House of Representatives 
Biss ran for a seat in the Illinois State House of Representatives in 2008, losing to Republican Elizabeth Coulson in the 17th district. Starting in 2009, he then worked as a policy adviser to Pat Quinn, the Democratic governor of Illinois. He successfully ran for the same Illinois State House seat in 2010.

Committee assignments 
Appropriations – Elementary & Secondary Education
Personnel & Pensions
Consumer Protection
Small Business Empowerment & Workforce Development
International Trade & Commerce 
Bio-Technology
Appropriations – Higher Education

Tenure

Illinois Senate 
On November 10, 2011, Biss announced his intent to run for the Illinois Senate seat held by retiring Senator Jeffrey Schoenberg. He won the election on November 6, 2012, receiving over 66% of the vote, and was sworn in on January 8, 2013. The district included a number of Chicago's northern suburbs, including Evanston, Glencoe, Glenview, Morton Grove, Northbrook, Northfield, Skokie, Wilmette, and Winnetka.

Committee assignments

Tenure

Political positions 
According to his responses in a 2008 "Political Courage Test", Daniel Biss supports carbon emissions limits and is pro-choice (supporting legal access to abortion services). He also supports allowing Illinois high school graduates to pay in-state tuition at public universities regardless of immigration status, as well as state funding to raise the salaries of teachers. He received a 7% rating by the NRA in 2010. Biss has expressed support of labor unions and he received a $20,000 campaign contribution from AFSCME. Biss also supports legalizing marijuana in Illinois.

In 2013, Biss cosponsored SB 1, a bill that aimed to limit the annual growth of retirement annuities within state employee's pension plans in an attempt to reduce debts in the state retirement system. In May 2015, the Illinois Supreme Court found the law unconstitutional. In rejecting the constitutionality of SB 1, the Illinois Supreme Court stated: "These modifications to pension benefits unquestionably diminish the value of the retirement annuities the members…were promised when they joined the pension system. Accordingly, based on the plain language of the Act, these annuity-reducing provisions contravene the pension protection clause's absolute prohibition against diminishment of pension benefits and exceed the General Assembly's authority," the ruling states. Biss later said that his work on SB 1 was an error, saying, "I decided this was the least bad of the bad options. I allowed myself to think we couldn't do better." Biss later expressed support for funding higher pension payments if necessary by instituting a tax system with a graduated income tax and a tax on financial transactions.

In March 2017, Biss sponsored SB 1424, a bill proposing a system of matching state funds for small-donor political contributions and SB 780, a bill proposing to elect a number of statewide offices by ranked-choice ballot. He also co-sponsored SB 1933, a bill by State Sen. Andy Manar to allow for automatic voter registration when applying for an Illinois driver's license.

Biss supports universal health care and advocates specifically for a state-level single-payer healthcare system. In June 2017, Biss voted to reinforce the Affordable Care Act in Illinois by prohibiting insurance companies from discriminating against customers with pre-existing conditions.

State comptroller candidacy
In 2015, Biss announced a run for Illinois Comptroller for the 2016 special election but dropped out and endorsed opponent Susana Mendoza.

2018 Illinois gubernatorial campaign 

On March 20, 2017, Biss announced his candidacy for the Democratic nomination for Governor of Illinois for the 2018 election on a Facebook Live video, attacking incumbent governor Bruce Rauner and Illinois House Speaker Mike Madigan. Biss joined a growing field of Democratic contenders, including businessman C. G. Kennedy and Chicago alderman Ameya Pawar.

Biss briefly named Chicago alderman and Democratic Socialists of America member Carlos Ramirez-Rosa as his gubernatorial running mate, but dropped him from the ticket after just six days because Ramirez-Rosa had expressed some support for the BDS movement which seeks to impose comprehensive boycotts on Israel over alleged human rights violations against Palestinians. Biss' ally, Representative Brad Schneider, had rescinded his endorsement of the ticket over his pick of Ramirez-Rosa as his running mate, though Biss denied that that affected his decision. Biss later announced his selection of Rockford-based state representative Litesa Wallace, a single mother and former social worker.

Biss was endorsed by many of his colleagues in the Illinois General Assembly, high-profile academics and activists including Nobel laureate Richard Thaler and presidential candidate Lawrence Lessig, National Nurses United, the largest organization of registered nurses in the United States, and Our Revolution, the successor organization to Bernie Sanders' 2016 presidential campaign. Biss received two-thirds of preferential votes from Illinois members of the progressive advocacy group MoveOn.org.

On March 20, 2018, Biss lost the Democratic primary to J. B. Pritzker. He received 26.70% of the total vote, behind Pritzker with 45.13% and ahead of Chris Kennedy with 24.37%. Biss carried two counties, McLean and Champaign.

Post-Senate activities 
Having not sought reelection in the 2018 Illinois Senate election (instead running for governor), Biss was succeeded in the Illinois Senate by Laura Fine on January 6, 2019.

On September 18, 2018, Biss announced in an email to supporters that he had accepted the position of executive director of the nonprofit Rust Belt Rising, which aims to train and support Democratic candidates in the Great Lakes states.

On August 15, 2019, Biss endorsed Elizabeth Warren for president. In January 2020, Biss was selected to be on Warren's slate of 101 potential Illinois delegates to the 2020 Democratic National Convention, but Warren suspended her campaign on March 5, before the presidential primary in Illinois on March 17.

Mayor of Evanston

2021 mayoral campaign

On September 16, 2020, Biss announced the launch of a campaign for mayor of Evanston, Illinois. On October 28, 2020, the incumbent mayor, Steve Hagerty, announced that he would not be seeking reelection.

Biss' mayoral campaign received many prominent endorsements. In December 2020, his campaign rolled out a list of 100 endorsements, including those of nine Evanston aldermen, as well as United States congresswoman Jan Schakowsky; state senator Laura Fine; state representatives Kelly Cassidy, Robyn Gabel, Jennifer Gong-Gershowitz; and Cook County commissioner Larry Suffredin. The Democratic Party of Evanston gave Biss its endorsement, as did Northside Democracy for America, the Organization for Positive Action and Leadership (OPAL), and the Community Alliance for Better Government (CABG). Biss was also endorsed by incumbent mayor Stephen Hagerty, and former mayors Elizabeth Tisdahl and Jay Lytle. On February 18, 2021, Biss' former gubernatorial primary opponent J.B. Pritzker, now the governor of Illinois, endorsed his candidacy for mayor.

Biss had a vast financial advantage over his two opponents. In the first three months after announcing his candidacy, he had received in excess of $100,000 in contributions. By that point, opponent Lori Keenan had only raised $3,000 and opponent Sebastian Nalls  had only raised $1,000.

Biss won a landslide victory in the consolidated primary on February 23, 2021, forgoing the need for a runoff by receiving an outright majority of the vote. Biss won all but one of the city's 50 voting precincts.

Transition
Ahead of the April 6 Evanston municipal general election, mayor-elect Biss criticized the group Evanston Together LLC for distributing mailers which inaccurately implied that several candidates for municipal office had outright supported switching the city from a council-manager government to a strong mayor government. Biss also remarked that, while a shift in the city's form of government would not be a priority to him, he is not opposed to exploring the idea if it would remedy issues in the city.

In March 2021, after Evanston passed a measure establishing the first expenditure of the city's first-in-the-nation municipal fund offering reparations to black residents, mayor-elect Biss released a statement in support of the approved measure. Biss also gave outgoing mayor Steve Hagerty input on the members he recommended to the city's Reparations Committee.

Tenure
On May 10, 2021, Biss took office as mayor.

Electoral history

Illinois House of Representatives
2008

2010

Illinois Senate
2012

2014

Illinois gubernatorial

Evanston mayoral

References

External links 
Biography, bills and committees at the 98th Illinois General Assembly
By session: 98th, 97th
Illinois State Senator Daniel Biss legislative website
Senator Daniel Biss  at Illinois Senate Democrats
Daniel Biss for Illinois campaign website

Rust Belt Rising, political organization that Biss is executive director of

1977 births
20th-century American mathematicians
21st-century American mathematicians
21st-century American politicians
American people of Romanian-Jewish descent
American people of Russian-Jewish descent
Harvard College alumni
Democratic Party Illinois state senators
Institute for Advanced Study visiting scholars
Jewish American state legislators in Illinois
Living people
Mayors of Evanston, Illinois
MIT School of Humanities, Arts, and Social Sciences alumni
Mathematicians from Illinois
Mathematicians from Ohio
Democratic Party members of the Illinois House of Representatives
People from Bloomington, Illinois
People from Evanston, Illinois
Politicians from Akron, Ohio
Topologists
21st-century American Jews